Tony Rothman (born 1953) is an American theoretical physicist, academic and writer.

Early life
Tony is the son of physicist and science fiction writer Milton A. Rothman and psychotherapist Doris W. Rothman. 
He holds a B.A. from Swarthmore College, (1975) and a PhD from the University of Texas at Austin (1981), where he studied at the Center for Relativity.  He continued on post-doctoral fellowships at Oxford, Moscow State University and the University of Cape Town.

Career
Rothman worked briefly as an editor at Scientific American, then taught at Harvard, Illinois Wesleyan University, Bryn Mawr College and from 2005 to 2013 at Princeton University.  In January 2016 he joined the faculty of NYU Polytech, now known as the Tandon School of Engineering and retired from teaching there in 2019.

Rothman's scientific research has been concerned mainly with general relativity and cosmology, for which he has made contributions to the  study of the early universe, specifically cosmic nucleosynthesis, black holes, inflationary cosmology and gravitons.

Rothman was the scientific editor for Andrei Sakharov's Memoirs and he has contributed to numerous magazines, including Scientific American, Discover, American Scientist, The New Republic and History Today. He has played oboe at a professional level and commissioned a concerto from Alexander Raskatov.

Selected works
Tony Rothman's first book, written just after graduating college, was The World is Round (Ballantine, 1978), a science fiction novel about the evolution of society on a non-earthlike planet.  His experiences in Russia resulted in publication of a collection of short stories entitled Censored Tales (1989).  He has also published six books of popular science and science history.  His collection A Physicist on Madison Avenue (1991) was nominated for the Pulitzer Prize, while Doubt and Certainty, with George Sudarshan, was chosen by the A-List as one of the 200 best books of 1998. He co-authored Sacred Mathematics: Japanese Temple Geometry with Fukagawa Hidetoshi. Published in 2008, this was the first history of sangaku in English, and won the Association of American Publisher's 2008 PROSE award for Professional and Scholarly Excellence in mathematics.  His play The Magician and the Fool, about Pushkin and Galois, won the 1981 Oxford Experimental Theatre Club competition, and his play The Sand Reckoner, about Archimedes, received a staged reading at Harvard in 1995.  He has also written five other plays, on mathematical and musical subjects.

Rothman's published writings encompass hundreds of works in 7 languages and include 3,073 library holdings.

 2022 — A Little Book about the Big Bang
 2016 — Physics Mastery
 2015 — The Course of Fortune
 2015 — Firebird
 2008 — Sacred Mathematics: Japanese Temple Geometry (with Hidetoshi Fukagawa)
 2003 — Everything's relative: and other fables from science and technology
 1998 — Doubt and certainty: the celebrated academy (with E.C.G. Sudarshan)
 1995 —  Instant physics: from Aristotle to Einstein, and beyond 
 1991 — A physicist on Madison Avenue 
 1989 — Science à la mode: physical fashions and fictions
 1989 — Censored tales
 1985 — Frontiers of modern physics: new perspectives on cosmology, relativity, black holes, and extraterrestrial intelligence
 1978 — The World is Round

Notes

External links
Tony Rothman's home page

20th-century American novelists
American male novelists
American science fiction writers
1953 births
Living people
Swarthmore College alumni
University of Texas at Austin alumni
University of Cape Town alumni
Harvard University faculty
Princeton University faculty
Bryn Mawr College faculty
Illinois Wesleyan University faculty
American male short story writers
20th-century American short story writers
Polytechnic Institute of New York University faculty
20th-century American male writers
Novelists from Pennsylvania
Novelists from New Jersey
Novelists from Illinois
Novelists from Massachusetts
Novelists from New York (state)